Wise Girl may refer to:

Wise Girl (film), a 1937 screwball comedy starring Miriam Hopkins and Ray Milland
Wise Girl (album), by Belgian singer Natalia
Die Kluge (The Wise [Girl]), an opera by Carl Orff

See also
Wise Girls (film), a 1929 film 
WiseGirls, a 2002 film most notably featuring Mariah Carey